John Morogiello (born 16 May 1965) is an American playwright In residence with the Maryland State Arts Council.  Since 2016, he has served as Artistic Director of Best Medicine Rep, a theater company located in Gaithersburg, Maryland that specializes in new comedies.  Morogiello's work has been compared to that of British playwright Tom Stoppard. In 1996, Morogiello was named Best Up and Coming Playwright by Baltimore Magazine and was awarded a Kennedy Center Fellowship of the Americas.

Career 
Morogiello's plays are often comedic examinations of history, literature, office politics, or a life in the theater.  His comedy The Consul, The Tramp, and America's Sweetheart won the 2015 Julie Harris Playwright Award Competition and the Dayton Playhouse FutureFest.  Other full length titles include Die, Mr. Darcy, Die!, The Crater Sisters Christmas Special (co-written with Lori Boyd), Engaging Shaw, Blame It On Beckett, Civilizing Lusby, Play Date, Stonewall's Bust, Irish Authors Held Hostage, and Gianni Schicchi.  One acts include Jack The Ticket Ripper, Larry's Resolution, The Little Farmer, and Men and Parts.  He is a regular contributor to the Flagpole Radio Cafe, a variety show in Newtown, Connecticut.

Morogiello began working as a Teaching Artist with the Center Stage Playwrights in the Schools program in 1997.  In 2001, he began teaching as a Maryland State Arts Council Playwright in Residence.  He has regularly taught playwriting to students at Potomac, Chevy Chase, Bells Mill, Somerset, Clearspring, and Villa Cresta Elementary Schools.  He has provided professional development workshops at the Maryland Artist Teacher Institute, Teaching Artist Institute, and the Maryland Conference for Teachers of English and Language Arts.

References

20th-century American dramatists and playwrights
1965 births
Living people